Lieutenant-Colonel Frederick Sadleir Brereton, CBE (5 August 1872 – 12 August 1957) who often wrote under the name Captain Brereton, was a British Army medical officer and an author of children's books on heroic deeds conducted in the name of the British Empire.

Early career
Brereton was commissioned into the Royal Army Medical Corps (RAMC) as a surgeon-lieutenant on 29 January 1896, and was promoted to captain on 29 January 1899. During the Second Boer War he was attached as a medical officer to the Scots Guards. He retired his commission on 22 November 1902, after the end of the war in South Africa.

First World War 

Brereton served again in the RAMC during the First World War with the rank of Brevet Lieutenant Colonel. In 1919 he was appointed as a Commander of the Portuguese Order of Aviz and a CBE.

Personal life 

Brereton married Ethel Lamb in 1898 and Isobel Murdoch in 1953.

Bibliography

References

External links 
 
 
 
 The Dacorum Heritage Trust article on F. S. Brereton.
 Who's who 2016 & Who was who article on F. S. Brereton.

1872 births
1957 deaths
19th-century British writers
20th-century British writers
20th-century English medical doctors
British Army personnel of World War I
British military personnel of the Second Boer War
Commanders of the Order of Aviz
Royal Army Medical Corps officers